Johnny Miqueiro  (born 18 July 1964, in Montevideo) is a former Uruguayan footballer.

Club career
Miqueiro was the leading scorer in the Primera División Uruguaya during the 1989 season, helping Progreso win the championship.

International career
Miqueiro made 2 appearances for the senior Uruguay national football team during 1990.

References

 

1964 births
Living people
Uruguayan footballers
Uruguay international footballers
C.A. Progreso players
Sagan Tosu players
C.S. Emelec footballers
Footballers from Montevideo
Sud América players
Uruguayan Primera División players
Uruguayan expatriate footballers
Expatriate footballers in Ecuador

Association football forwards